Akia Aretha Guerrier (born November 9, 1998) is a sprinter for the Turks and Caicos Islands. She specialises in the 100m, 200m and 400m sprints. She is also currently the national record holder for the Turks and Caicos Islands for the 100m, 200m, 400m as well as Long Jump. Akia has competed in numerous international events for the Turks and Caicos Islands such as: World Youth Games 2015 - Columbia, Commonwealth youth Games 2015 - Samoa, and World Junior Championships 2016 - Poland.

Personal bests

References
 

1998 births
Living people
Turks and Caicos Islands female sprinters
British female sprinters
Competitors at the 2018 Central American and Caribbean Games